Ādams Kāpostiņš (Latgalian: Odumeņš Kopusteņš, 27 July 1905 – 7 February 1987) was a Latvian and Latgalian ceramicist.

Biography
Ādams Kāpostiņš was born at Puša village in Puša Parish, Russian Empire in 1905. He became a ceramicist in 1919, at the age of 14, continuing the family tradition. His grandfather and father were also ceramicists.

One of Kāpostiņš trademarks were face jugs and ceramic figures. His works were selected for the exhibitions since 1955. Kāpostiņš had a personal exhibition in Rēzekne at his 75th-anniversary in 1980 and his works were also displayed in exhibitions outside the Latvian SSR.

Kāpostiņš died in Puša on 7 February 1987.

Legacy
In 2015, there was an exposition in the Rainis Museum in Jasmuiža Manor, dedicated to the 110th jubilee of Kāpostiņš. It featured a renovated unique tile stove that was relocated from ceramicists house in Puša, originally made by Kāpostiņš.

Honors
 1981: Andrejs Paulāns Medal

References

External links 

 Works by Kāpostiņš @ Latgale Culture History Museum

1905 births
1987 deaths
20th-century Latgalian ceramists
20th-century Latvian ceramists
Soviet ceramists